Michele Marsh sometimes credited as Michèle Marsh, is a French-American television, theater, and film actress. She is best known for her portrayal of Hodel, the second of Tevye’s five daughters who falls in love with a student radical, in the 1971 film Fiddler on the Roof. She has acted mainly in television and in West Coast theatre. She now resides in Idyllwild, California, where she performs with the Idyllwild Actors Theatre.

Early life and education
She was born Michèle Noelle Buhler in Mulhouse, France, to Swiss composer Philippe Henri Buhler (born Lausanne, Switzerland) and Colette Jeanne Buhler née Darolle (born Cahors, France). From June 1949 to August 1950 she and her parents resided in Stamford, Connecticut, where her father taught music theory in private schools. In October 1950, she and her parents returned permanently to the United States, settling in Washington, D.C. The following year, they relocated to Idyllwild, California, where her father taught in the private Desert Sun School. She attended elementary school in Idyllwild and took classes at the Idyllwild School of Music and the Arts before the family moved upstate to the Monterey Peninsula in 1959. She appeared in the musical The King and I at the Wharf Theater in Monterey, playing one of the children.

After earning her Bachelor of Fine Arts degree, she joined the American Conservatory Theater in San Francisco.

Fiddler on the Roof

Marsh made her film debut in the 1971 film Fiddler on the Roof. During high school, Marsh had played one of Tevye's younger daughters, Bielke, in the play Tevye and His Daughters. In the film, she portrays the second-eldest daughter, Hodel, who falls in love with Perchik, a student radical who breaks tradition by dancing hand-in-hand with Hodel at her older sister's wedding. After Perchik asks her to marry him—another break with tradition—the couple tells Tevye that they do not seek his permission to marry, only his blessing. When Perchik is exiled to Siberia, Hodel leaves home to join him. Marsh is one of the singers of "Matchmaker, Matchmaker" and performs the solo "Far From the Home I Love".

Acting career
After completing Fiddler on the Roof, Marsh moved to Los Angeles and appeared mainly in television and in West Coast theatre.

Television credits

 Love, American Style (1972)
 Mannix, episode "Lost Sunday" (1972)
 Gunsmoke, 2 episodes (1974–1975)
 The Magician (1974)
 Sandburg's Lincoln (1975)
 Movin' On (1976)
 The Last of the Mohicans (1977)
 The Immigrants (1978)
 The Adventures of Huckleberry Finn (1981)
 Quincy, M.E. (1981)
 Little House on the Prairie (1982)
 Sledge Hammer!, 2 episodes (1986)
 Star Trek: The Next Generation, Season 1: "When the Bough Breaks" (1987)
 Highway to Heaven (1989)
 Shootdown (1989)
 Tribes (1989–1990)
 Nothing Sacred (1998)
 Memory in My Heart (1999)
 Diagnosis: Murder, 1 episode (2000)
 The West Wing (1999)
 Titus (1999–2000)
 The Dead One (2007)
 Desperate Housewives (2008)
 House, M.D., Season 8, Episode 2: "Transplant" (2011)
 Bucket & Skinner's Epic Adventures (2013)

Sources:

Film credits
 Fiddler on the Roof (1971)
 God Bless Dr. Shagetz (1976)
 Tough Guys (1986)
 Evil Town (1987)
 Miracle on 34th Street (1994)
 El Muerto (2006)

Sources:

Personal life
Marsh lives in Idyllwild, California, with her third husband, Peter Szabadi, a retired litigation attorney. They married in 2005. Her first husband was Van Cade Marsh, Jr.; they married in 1965 and divorced in 1970. Her second husband was actor Joel Rudnick; they married in 1972 and divorced in 1981.

Marsh performs with the Idyllwild Actors Theatre, and also serves as a secretary/hospitality director for the group.

References

Sources

External links

Living people
American film actresses
American television actresses
Actors from California
21st-century American actresses
Year of birth missing (living people)
French emigrants to the United States
1940s births